Sjölund is a Swedish surname. It is a contraction of sjö (lake) and lund (grove or copse). Notable people with the surname include:

Anne-Li Sjölund (born 1966) a Swedish politician
Annica Sjölund (born 1985), a Finnish footballer 
Daniel Sjölund (born 1983), a Finnish footballer 
Kurt Sjolund (born 1955), a Canadian skier

Swedish-language surnames